This is a list of franchise records for the Buffalo Sabres, the professional ice hockey team based in Buffalo, New York. They are members of the Atlantic Division of the Eastern Conference of the National Hockey League (NHL).

The Sabres first joined the league as an expansion team in 1970.

Career leaders 
Active leaders as of 2017-18 season

Career regular season records, skaters

Single season records

Team

†Excluding the lockout-shortened 1994-95 and 2012-13 seasons

Skaters

Goalies

References

External links 

 Official website of the Buffalo Sabres
 Buffalo Sabres Alumni Association

Records
National Hockey League statistical records